Ornithophila are a genus of biting flies in the family of louse flies, Hippoboscidae. There are two known species. Both species are parasites of birds.

Distribution
Ornithophila are found worldwide with the exception of the Americas and Antarctica.

Systematics
Genus Ornithophila Rondani, 1879
O. gestroi (Rondani, 1878)
O. metallica (Schiner, 1864)

References

Parasites of birds
Hippoboscidae
Hippoboscoidea genera
Taxa named by Camillo Rondani